Pterygia scabricula is a species of sea snail, a marine gastropod mollusk in the family Mitridae, the miters or miter snails.

Description

Distribution
This marine species occurs off Madagascar.

References

 Poppe G.T. & Tagaro S.P. (2008). Mitridae. pp. 330–417, in: G.T. Poppe (ed.), Philippine marine mollusks, volume 2. Hackenheim: ConchBooks. 848 pp.

Mitridae
Gastropods described in 1767
Taxa named by Carl Linnaeus